Video Olympics is a video game programmed by Joe Decuir for the Atari 2600. It is one of the nine 2600 launch titles Atari, Inc. published when that system was released in September 1977. The cartridge is a collection of games from Atari's popular arcade Pong series. A similar collection in arcade machine form called Tournament Table was published by Atari in 1978.

Video Olympics was rebranded by Sears as Pong Sports.

Gameplay
The games are a collection of bat-and-ball style games, including several previously released by Atari, Inc. as arcade games. The games use the Video Computer System's paddle controllers, and are for one to four players (three or four players requires a second set of paddles).

Games

Video Olympics includes 50 games and variations:

 Pong - The classic table tennis simulation.
 Super Pong - A Pong variation where each player has two paddles.
 Robot Pong - A solitaire Pong variation.
 Pong Doubles
 Quadrapong - A four-player, four-wall Pong variation.
 Foozpong - Based on Foozball, this Pong variant has the players control a vertical three-paddle column.
 Soccer
 Handball - A handball simulation.
 Ice hockey
 Hockey III - An ice hockey simulation where players can catch and shoot the puck at the opposing goal.
 Basketball - A basketball simulation.
 Volleyball - A volleyball simulation where the traditional (Pong-style) left-right volley is swapped for a top-bottom volley. Players can volley or spike.

Reception
The cartridge and its individual games were reviewed twice in Video magazine. In the Winter 1979 issue of Video, the cartridge was reviewed as part of a general review of the Atari VCS where it received a review score of 8.5 out of 10, and its constituent games were characterized as "old standbys" but "still lots of fun". A more thorough review appeared in Video'''s "Arcade Alley" column in the Summer 1979 issue where the release was generally praised for "tak[ing] Atari's Pong concept and explor[ing] it to the limit." Individual games were singled out as well, with praise for Volleyball and Robot Pong (described as "astonishingly good"), and criticism for Handball (for its use of a visually disturbing blinking paddle rather than an absent'' paddle to indicate inactive players), and Basketball (described as primitive compared to Atari's own 1978 version of Basketball).

See also

List of Atari 2600 games

References

External links
Video Olympics at Atari Mania

1977 video games
Atari 2600 games
Atari games
North America-exclusive video games
Pong variations
Multiple-sport video games
Video games developed in the United States